The Music Show may refer to:

 The Music Show, part of Classical Baby, an American children's TV show
The Music Show (Australia), a radio program on ABC Radio National since 1991
The Music Show (Ireland), an annual music industry event held in Dublin
The Music Show (Scotland), a television show run on BBC Two Scotland from 2005 to 2014
The Music Show (US), an American 1950s television show

See also
 Music Show, a racehorse